Joseph Robert Robinson (born 25 May 1991), is an Australian guitar player and vocalist. A largely self-taught musician from Temagog, NSW, he is best known for his virtuoso guitar abilities and for winning the 2008 season of Australia's Got Talent.

Biography 
Robinson was born in Temagog, New South Wales, Australia. He started playing piano at the age of six, only because he was told his fingers were too small to play the guitar. Aged ten, he quit piano and began to play the guitar. He outgrew his guitar teacher in less than 12 months, and started to teach himself from the internet.

When he was eleven years old, Joe began touring with different Australian artists, including Tommy Emmanuel, who became his mentor.

When Robinson was 13, he won the Australian National Songwriting Competition.

In 2006 he recorded his debut album, titled Birdseed, produced by Parris Macleod at Cloud Studios in Wyong, New South Wales.

At the age of seventeen, Robinson won the Australia's Got Talent grand finale on 1 July 2008, performing a fingerstyle cover of "Classical Gas."

In August 2008, Joe travelled to Nashville, Tennessee, and recorded his second album "Time Jumpin" with producer Frank Rogers. "Time Jumpin'" was released in 2009.

On 19 July 2009, Robinson was awarded the 2009 Senior Grand Champion Performer of the World at the World Championships of Performing Arts in Los Angeles and also won the instrumental category among seniors in the same competition, as well as the male instrumental categories Contemporary, Jazz, Open and Original Works in the class of 16- to 24-year-old contestants.

In September 2009, he formed the Joe Robinson Electric Project with Sam Marks on drums and Chris Haigh on bass, embarking on an Australian national tour. Joe was the opening act for Australian music icon John Farnham in a series of six consecutive shows at the Burswood Theatre in Perth in October 2009 as part of Farnham's comeback tour.

After moving to Nashville, Tennessee at the age of 18  he was invited to perform at the prestigious Bonnaroo Music Festival in June 2010.

Robinson was named "Best New Talent" in Guitar Player magazine 2010 Reader's Poll. Lenny Breau and Tommy Emmanuel have inspired him to develop his own harmonic technique.

In September 2010, he performed at Live on the Green in Nashville, TN, alongside "The Wailers." Then in November, Robinson began "The Houdini tour" in Europe, traveling through Germany, Czech Republic, Croatia, Slovakia, Austria, Hungary, Serbia and Italy. From the beginning, Robinson’s concept of this tour was to "escape the expectations" of him as a performer. He added vocal selections and brought along two musicians from the United States, bassist Bernard Harris and drummer Marcus Hill. After the month-long acclaimed European performances, Robinson continued on to Japan for a stint of highly anticipated solo appearances in Tokyo and Osaka through mid-December. His first time in Japan proved to be widely lauded and well received for the 19-year-old musician. From those shows he landed a recording contract with P-Vine Records. Returning to his Australian homeland for the holidays, Robinson resumed his tour on 5 January in Eumundi and ended it on 29 January in Melbourne.

He spent much of 2011 in the studio recording his third album featuring vocal bass material and a rhythm section Keith Carlock and Michael Rhodes bass. The first single, "Out Alive," was released in Australia on 2 December 2011 with the full CD "Let Me Introduce You" released through Australian label ABC on 20 January 2012. Robinson toured Australia to promote the release, including a five performances at the Woodford Folk Festival in late December 2011.

In 2012, Robinson released the "Toe Jam" EP on which he wrote, produced and played most of the instruments. Upon completion of the EP, Joe and his two musicians, Sam Marks (drums) and Marcelo Bakos (bass guitar) toured the US, headlining shows in New York, Chicago, DC, and Boston. While in Boston, Joe gave a seminar at the prestigious Berklee College of Music.

He returned to Australia in late 2012 for a series of headline dates and festivals, which included the Festival of the Sun in Port Maquarie, NSW. Robinson released his new EP through the independent distributor MGM to coincide with the tour.

Robinson spent the majority of 2013 touring North America. Headlining clubs all over the North East, as well as stints in Texas and the West Coast. After a short headlining run in China and Japan, he spent most of the summer playing festivals, including Canada 's Ottawa Bluesfest (alongside The Black Keys and Dixie Chicks), Nashville's Live on the Green with Robert Randolph and Fender's celebration event leading up to the Eric Clapton Crossroads Guitar Festival at Madison Square Garden.

In 2014, he released the "Gemini Vol.1" EP,. Although a strong vocal performance carries the EP, it is his driving guitar - a mix of blues, rock, jazz, and R&B all his own - that ties it to his previous releases. Robinson played almost every instrument on the self-produced EP, lending a level of intimacy to the album.

Following up "Gemini Vol.2" was released 31 October 2015. Joe played all the instruments, produced and mixed the 4 song EP.

Touring extensively with his solo show in 2016, Robinson also collaborated with 'Guitar Army', a trio of triple threat guitar players, writers and singers; Robinson, Robben Ford and Lee Roy Parnell.

Discography

Studio albums

Singles and EPs

Appearances

Compilations

Credits

See also 
Kempsey, New South Wales
St Paul's College, Kempsey
Australia's Got Talent
Chet Atkins
Jerry Reed
Tommy Emmanuel

References

External links
Official Website
YouTube
Instagram

1991 births
Australia's Got Talent winners
Fingerstyle guitarists
Musicians from Sydney
Living people
Australian guitarists
21st-century guitarists